Maplestone is a surname. Notable people with the surname include:
 Charlie Maplestone (1876–1937), a former Australian rules football player
 Henry Maplestone (1870–1949), an Australian cricket player
 Lyn Maplestone, an Australian film director, production manager at the Cinema and Photographic Branch from 1926